Geobacter daltonii  is a Gram-negative, Fe(III)- and Uranium(IV)-reducing and non-spore-forming bacterium from the genus of Geobacter. It was isolated from sediments from the Oak Ridge Field Research Center in Oak Ridge, Tennessee in the United States. The specific epithet "daltonii" was refers to Dava Dalton, who performed the initial isolation of the strain, but passed away shortly thereafter.

Characteristics 
Geobacter species are known for their ability to facilitate extracellular electron transfer. A feature of G. daltonii specifically is the pili structures that are electrically conductive allowing for connections to other cells, free minerals in their environment, and other electrodes. This may have implications for the utilization of G. daltonii as a tool in environmental remediation of U(VI). In 2022 a proposal was made to reclassify organisms in the Deltaproteobacteria class, including G. daltonii.

See also 
 List of bacterial orders
 List of bacteria genera

References

 

Bacteria described in 2010
Thermodesulfobacteriota